Estella Occidental is a comarca in Navarre, Spain.

Municipalities
The comarca consists of seventeen municipalities, with the largest being the municipality of Viana. They are listed below with their populations at recent censuses, together with the most recent official estimate:

References 

Comarcas of Navarre